Génesis: en la mente del asesino or simply Génesis is a Spanish police procedural television series produced by Ida y vuelta. Its two seasons aired on Cuatro from 2006 to 2007.

Premise 
The plot concerns the work of a police unit created specifically to deal with particularly sadistic and unfathomable crimes. To that end, the unit tries to get to the criminal's mind by using psychology and criminal anthropology methods.

Cast 
 Verónica Sánchez as Lola Casado.
  as Mateo.
 Quim Gutiérrez as Daniel "Dani".
 Álvaro Báguena as Gustavo.
 Sonia Almarcha as Laura.
  as Fátima.
Introduced in season 2
 Fanny Gautier as Alex.
 Juana Acosta as Sofías.
 Enrique Arce as Julián.
  as Seca.

Production and release 
Génesis: en la mente del asesino was produced by Ida y vuelta. Gregorio Quintana and Jorge Redondo were credited as executive producers. The series premiered on Cuatro 3 May 2006 and it earned "good" viewership ratings in the first episode (1,127,000 viewers and 6.1% share), above the channel's average. The episodes featured a running time of 50 minutes (rather than the 70 minutes traditional for prime time Spanish television titles). Despite the waning interest, the series was renovated for a second season. Fanny Gautier, Juana Acosta, Enrique Arce and Roger Coma were added to the cast to compensate for the leaving of Verónica Sánchez.

The broadcasting run ended after 2 seasons and 22 episodes on 22 April 2007.

Season 1

Season 2

References 

2006 Spanish television series debuts
2007 Spanish television series endings
2000s Spanish drama television series
2000s police procedural television series
Cuatro (TV channel) original programming
Spanish police procedural television series
Spanish thriller television series
Spanish mystery television series